Alexander "Sandy" McCall Smith, CBE, FRSE (born 24 August 1948), is a British legal scholar and author of fiction. He was raised in Southern Rhodesia (now Zimbabwe) and formerly Professor of Medical Law at the University of Edinburgh. He became an expert on medical law and bioethics and served on related British and international committees. He has since become known as a fiction writer, with sales in English exceeding 40 million by 2010 and translations into 46 languages. He is known as the creator of The No. 1 Ladies' Detective Agency series. The "McCall" derives from his great-great-grandmother Bethea McCall, who married James Smith at Glencairn, Dumfries-shire, in 1833.

Early life
Alexander McCall Smith was born in 1948 in Bulawayo in the British colony of Southern Rhodesia (present-day Zimbabwe), to British parents. He was the only son, having three elder sisters. His father worked as a public prosecutor in Bulawayo. McCall Smith's paternal grandfather was the medical doctor and New Zealand community leader George Marshall McCall Smith, born at Nairn in Scotland. McCall Smith was educated at the Christian Brothers College in Bulawayo before moving to Scotland at age 17 to study law at the University of Edinburgh, where he earned his LLB and PhD degrees. He soon taught at Queen's University Belfast, and while teaching there he entered a literary competition: one a children's book and the other a novel for adults. He won in the children's category.

Professional career

He returned to southern Africa in 1981 to help co-found the law school and teach law at the University of Botswana. While there, he co-wrote The Criminal Law of Botswana (1992).

He was Professor of Medical Law at the University of Edinburgh and is now Emeritus Professor at its School of Law. He retains a further involvement with the university in relation to the James Tait Black Memorial Prize.
 
He is the former chairman of the Ethics Committee of the British Medical Journal (until 2002), the former vice-chairman of the Human Genetics Commission of the United Kingdom, and a former member of the International Bioethics Committee of UNESCO. After achieving success as a writer, he gave up these commitments. He was appointed a CBE in the New Year's Honours List issued at the end of December 2006 for services to literature. In June 2007, he was awarded the Honorary Degree of Doctor of Laws at a ceremony celebrating the tercentenary of the University of Edinburgh School of Law. In June 2015 he was awarded the honorary degree of Doctor of Letters at a graduation ceremony at the University of St Andrews.

Personal life
He settled in Edinburgh, Scotland, in 1984. He and his wife Elizabeth, a physician, bought and renovated a large Victorian mansion in the Merchiston/Morningside area of the city. They lived there for almost 30 years, raising their two daughters. Nearby lived the authors J. K. Rowling, Ian Rankin, and Kate Atkinson.

An amateur bassoonist, he co-founded The Really Terrible Orchestra. He has helped to found Botswana's first centre for opera training, the Number 1 Ladies' Opera House, for whom he wrote the libretto of their first production, a version of Macbeth set among a troop of baboons in the Okavango Delta.

In 2009 he received the Golden Plate Award of the American Academy of Achievement presented by Awards Council member Archbishop Desmond Tutu at an awards ceremony at St. George's Cathedral in Cape Town, South Africa.

In 2012 he appeared in a documentary about the life and work of author W. Somerset Maugham, Revealing Mr. Maugham.

In 2014 McCall Smith purchased the Cairns of Coll, a chain of uninhabited islets in the Hebrides. He said, "I intend to do absolutely nothing with them, and to ensure that, after I am gone, they are held in trust, unspoilt and uninhabited, for the nation. I want them kept in perpetuity as a sanctuary for wildlife – for birds and seals and all the other creatures to which they are home."

During a visit to New Zealand in 2014 McCall Smith visited Rawene, where his grandfather, George McCall Smith, ran the hospital for 34 years and created the Hokianga area health service.

Author

McCall Smith is a prolific author of fiction, with several series to his credit. He writes at a prodigious rate: "Even when travelling, he never loses a day, turning out between 2,000 and 3,000 words [a day] – but more like 5,000 words when at home in Edinburgh. His usual rate is 1,000 words an hour." He has gained the most fame for his No. 1 Ladies Detective Agency series, featuring Mma Precious Ramotswe and set in Gaborone, Botswana. The first novel was published in 1998. By 2009, the No 1 Ladies’ Detective Agency series had sold more than 20 million copies in English editions.

According to his publisher in Edinburgh, "He was, until 2005, a professor of medical law at the University of Edinburgh, but gave up the position to concentrate on his writing and now writes full time."

He published 30 books in the 1980s and 1990s before he began the series that has brought him the world's notice. In 2008 he wrote a serialised online novel Corduroy Mansions, with the audio edition read by Andrew Sachs made available at the same pace as the daily publication. He wrote more than ten chapters ahead of publication, finding the experience of serialised publication to be "a frightening thing to create a novel while his readers watched. 'I am like a man on a tightrope.'"

In 2009 he donated the short story "Still Life" to Oxfam's "Ox-Tales" project, comprising four collections of stories written by 38 British authors. McCall Smith's story was published in the "Air" collection.

Bibliography

The No. 1 Ladies' Detective Agency series
1998: The No. 1 Ladies' Detective Agency
2000: Tears of the Giraffe
2001: Morality for Beautiful Girls
2002: The Kalahari Typing School for Men
2003: The Full Cupboard of Life
2004: In the Company of Cheerful Ladies (also known as: The Night-Time Dancer)
2006: Blue Shoes and Happiness
2007: The Good Husband of Zebra Drive
2008: The Miracle at Speedy Motors
2009: Tea Time for the Traditionally Built
2010: The Double Comfort Safari Club
2011: The Saturday Big Tent Wedding Party
2012: The Limpopo Academy of Private Detection
2013: The Minor Adjustment Beauty Salon
2014: The Handsome Man's De Luxe Café
2015: The Woman Who Walked in Sunshine
2016: Precious and Grace
2017: The House of Unexpected Sisters
2018: The Colors of All the Cattle
2019: To the Land of Long Lost Friends
2020: How to Raise an Elephant
2021: The Joy and Light Bus Company
2022: A Song of Comfortable Chairs

Extra: 2013: The Slice of No. 1 Celebration Storybook (ebook only)

44 Scotland Street series
See also: Bertie Pollock, 44 Scotland Street
2005: 44 Scotland Street
2005: Espresso Tales
2006: Love Over Scotland
2007: The World According to Bertie
2008: The Unbearable Lightness of Scones
2010: The Importance of Being Seven
2011: Bertie Plays The Blues
2012: Sunshine on Scotland Street
2013: Bertie's Guide to Life and Mothers
2015: The Revolving Door of Life
2016: The Bertie Project
2017: A Time of Love and Tartan
2019: The Peppermint Tea Chronicles
2020: A Promise of Ankles
2022: Love in the Time of Bertie
2023: The Enigma of Garlic

The Sunday Philosophy Club series
also known as Isabel Dalhousie Mysteries
2004: The Sunday Philosophy Club
2005: Friends, Lovers, Chocolate
2006: The Right Attitude to Rain
2007: The Careful Use of Compliments
2008: The Comfort of Saturdays (UK title) or: The Comforts of a Muddy Saturday (American title)
2009: The Lost Art of Gratitude
2010: The Charming Quirks of Others
2011: The Forgotten Affairs of Youth
2011: The Perils of Morning Coffee (ebook only)
2012: The Uncommon Appeal of Clouds 
2015: The Novel Habits of Happiness
2015: At the Reunion Buffet (ebook only)
2016: Sweet, Thoughtful Valentine (ebook only)
2017: A Distant View of Everything 
2018: The Quiet Side of Passion
2020: The Geometry of Holding Hands
2022: The Sweet Remnants of Summer

Corduroy Mansions series
2009: Corduroy Mansions
2009: The Dog Who Came in from the Cold (published online daily in serial form; also published as a hardcover book on 1 May 2010)
2011: A Conspiracy of Friends

Professor Dr von Igelfeld Entertainments series
1997: Portuguese Irregular Verbs 
2003: The Finer Points of Sausage Dogs
2003: At the Villa of Reduced Circumstances
2004: The 2 Pillars of Wisdom – An omnibus edition of the first three von Igelfeld titles
2011: Unusual Uses for Olive Oil
2021: Your inner hedgehog

Detective Varg series
2019: The Strange Case of the Moderate Extremists (ebook only)
2019: The Department of Sensitive Crimes (his given name is stylised as Älexander on the cover)
2019: Varg in Love (ebook only)
2020: The Talented Mr. Varg
2021: The Man with the Silver Saab
2023: The Discreet Charm of the Big Bad Wolf

Big-Top Mysteries series
2019: The Case of the Vanishing Granny
2019: The Great Clown Conundrum

Paul Stewart series
2016: My Italian Bulldozer
2019: The Second Worst Restaurant in France

Other novels
2008: La's Orchestra Saves the World
2012: Trains and Lovers
2014: The Forever Girl
2014: Fatty O'Leary's Dinner Party
2015: Emma: A Modern Retelling
2017: The Good Pilot, Peter Woodhouse
2022: The Pavilion in the Clouds

Short stories
2011: "The Strange Story of Bobby Box" (published in the young adult anthology What You Wish For)

Anthologies
1991: Children of Wax: African Folk Tales
1995: Heavenly Date and Other Flirtations
2004: The Girl Who Married a Lion and Other Tales from Africa
2006: Baboons Who Went This Way and That (Tales from Africa)
2015: Chance Developments: Unexpected Love Stories
2016: Marvellous Mix-ups
2019: Pianos and Flowers

Children's novels
1980: The White Hippo
1984: The Perfect Hamburger
1988: Alix and the Tigers
1990: The Tin Dog
1991: Calculator Annie
1991: Marzipan Max
1991: The Popcorn Pirates
1992: The Doughnut Ring
1993: Who Invented Peanut Butter?
1994: Paddy and the Ratcatcher
1995: The Muscle Machine
1996: The Bubblegum Tree
1997: The Five Lost Aunts of Harriet Bean
2000: Teacher Trouble
2006: Dream Angus
2016: Freddie Mole, Lion Tamer
2018: Hari and his Electric Feet
2018: Max Champion and the Great Race Car Robbery

School Ship Tobermory
2015: School Ship Tobermory
2016: The Sands of Shark Island
2018: The Race to Kangaroo Cliff
2019: The Secret of the Dark Waterfall

Akimbo
1992: Akimbo and the Lions
1993: Akimbo and the Crocodile Man
2005: Akimbo and the Elephants
2006: Akimbo and the Snakes
2008: Akimbo and the Baboons

Harriet Bean
 1993: The Cowgirl Aunt of Harriet Bean
 1990: The Five Lost Aunts of Harriet Bean
 1991: Harriet Bean and the League of Cheats

Max & Maddy
 1997: Max & Maddy and the Bursting Balloons Mystery
 1999: Max & Maddy and the Chocolate Money Mystery

Young Precious Ramotswe
 2010: Precious and the Puggies (republished in 2011 as: Precious and the Monkeys, and in 2012 as The Great Cake Mystery)
 2012: Precious and the Mystery of Meerkat Hill
 2013: Precious and the Missing Lion
 2015: Precious and the Zebra Necklace

Memoir/literary appreciation
 2013: What Auden Can Do for You

Academic texts
1978: Power and Manoeuvrability (with Tony Carty)
1983: Law and Medical Ethics (with J. Kenyon Mason) (this text has gone through several editions: an eighth, by Mason and Graeme Laurie, was published in 2010; McCall Smith contributed to the first six editions)
1987: Butterworths Medico-Legal Encyclopaedia (with J. Kenyon Mason)
1990: Family Rights: Family Law and Medical Advances (with Elaine Sutherland)
1991: All About Drink and Drug Abuse (educational text)
1992: The Criminal Law of Botswana (with Kwame Frimpong)
1993: The Duty to Rescue (with Michael Menlowe, 1993)
1992: Scots Criminal Law (with David H Sheldon, second edition published 1997)
1997: Forensic Aspects of Sleep (with Colin Shapiro)
2000: Justice and the Prosecution of Old Crimes (with Daniel W. Shuman)
2001: Errors, Medicine and the Law (with Alan Merry)
2003: A Draft Criminal Code for Scotland (with Eric Clive, Pamela Ferguson and Christopher Gane)
2004: Creating Humans: Ethical Questions where Reproduction and Science Collide (collected lectures, audio recordings)

See also

White people in Zimbabwe

References

External links

 Prof. Alexander McCall Smith's homepage at the Law School, University of Edinburgh
 Author's homepage at Random House
 Author's homepage at Polygon & Birlinn Limited
 Author's homepage at Little, Brown
 
 
 Alexander McCall Smith interviewed on Conversations from Penn State
 Write TV Public Television Interview with Alexander McCall Smith
 Interview with the author at Powells.com

1948 births
Living people
People from Bulawayo
Writers from Edinburgh
Alumni of Christian Brothers College, Bulawayo
Alumni of the University of Edinburgh School of Law
Academics of the University of Edinburgh
British Book Award winners
Commanders of the Order of the British Empire
Fellows of the Royal Society of Edinburgh
Fellows of the Royal Society of Literature
Scholars of medical law
People associated with Edinburgh
Rhodesian novelists
Scottish children's writers
Scottish crime fiction writers
Scottish legal scholars
Scottish novelists
Scottish short story writers
Zimbabwean children's writers
Zimbabwean novelists
Zimbabwean male writers
British male novelists
Zimbabwean male short story writers
Zimbabwean short story writers
Zimbabwean people of Scottish descent
Scottish people of Zimbabwean descent
Audiobook narrators
Zimbabwean emigrants to the United Kingdom
Academic staff of the University of Botswana